Edip Yüksel (born December 20, 1957 in Güroymak, Turkey) is an American-Kurdish activist and prominent figure in the Quranism movement. He is a colleague and friend of the late Rashad Khalifa.

Biography 
Yüksel comes from a Kurdish family who lived in Turkey, and is brother of Metin Yüksel. He is the author of more than twenty books on religion, politics, philosophy and law in Turkish. He has also written various articles and essays in English. He was a Turkish Islamist and a popular Islamic commentator until the mid-1980s when he rejected his previous religious beliefs and only used the Quran as the source of divine laws. He became a Quran-only Muslim, or known as Quranist. However, this movement is very controversial in the main Muslim circles, and thus Yüksel gained the rejection and hostility of many religious Islamic authorities in his home country. In 1989 Yüksel was forced to emigrate. He then settled in the United States of America, where he began his career as a lawyer. In the US, he worked with Rashad Khalifa, who claimed to have discovered a Quran code, also known as Code 19, in the Quran and called on Muslims to return to the Quran alone and to abandon all hadiths.

Yüksel is critical of Islamic creationists, such as the jailed cult leader Harun Yahya.

Professor Aisha Musa, from Florida International University, says in her book Hadith as Scripture about Yüksel:

References

External links 

 

1957 births
Living people
People from Güroymak
American people of Kurdish descent
Turkish emigrants to the United States
Turkish Kurdish people
Turkish Quranist Muslims
American Quranist Muslims
Kurdish scholars
American Muslim pacifists